Medea is a 2021 Russian drama film directed by Alexander Zeldovich. It is scheduled to be theatrically released on 4 November 2021. The film has been officially invited in 'Harbour' section at the 51st International Film Festival Rotterdam to be held from January 26 to February 6, 2022.

Plot 
The film tells about a woman who is trapped as a result of too high a price for happiness and wants revenge.

Cast

References

External links 
 

2021 films
2020s Russian-language films
2021 drama films
Russian drama films